Rashmin Manharbhai Chhaya (born 12 January 1961) was an Indian Judge. he was the Chief Justice of Gauhati High Court. He is former Judge of Gujarat High Court. He has also served as Acting Chief Justice of Gujarat High Court.

Career 
He was born on 12 January 1961 at Veraval, Gujarat. He did Law at L.A. Shah Law College. He was enrolled as an Advocate in year 1984 with Bar Council of Gujarat. He has served as empaneled Advocate for various Municipal corporations, in Gujarat. He was appointed a Counsel for the Department of Income Tax in year 2001 for a period of two years. He was also appointed Additional Central Government Counsel in year 2004 and Senior Counsel for Union of India in year 2008. He has also appeared in various Constitutional Matters. He was elevated as an Additional Judge of Gujarat High Court on 17 February 2011 and made permanent on 28 January 2013. On 2 September 2021, he was appointed Acting Chief Justice of the Gujarat High Court. He was elevated as Chief Justice of Gauhati High Court on 23 June 2022.

References 

Indian judges
1961 births
Living people
Judges of the Gujarat High Court
People from Veraval